Borkino is a rural locality (a selo) in Ikryaninsky Selsoviet of Ikryaninsky District, Astrakhan Oblast, Russia. The population was 214 as of 2010. There are 8 streets.

Geography 
Borkino is located on the Khurdun River, 9 km southwest of Ikryanoye (the district's administrative centre) by road. Sergino is the nearest rural locality.

References 

Rural localities in Ikryaninsky District